Shodmon Hisor (Persian: , Dastai Futboli Shodmon) is a Tajikistan association football club from Hisor.

History

Domestic history

External links
 Результат мог быть лучше
Varzish-sport

Football clubs in Tajikistan